Pauline Theresa Moran (June 28, 1883 – January 25, 1952) billed as Polly Moran, was an American actress of vaudeville, stage and screen and comedian.

Career
Born in Chicago, Illinois, Moran started in vaudeville, and widely toured North America, as well as various other locations that included Europe and South Africa. An attractive beauty of Irish descent, she left vaudeville in 1914 after signing for Mack Sennett at Keystone Studios as one of his Sennett Bathing Beauties. There she honed the style of the brash, loud-mouthed, knock-about comedian by which she later became known. She proved effective at slapstick and remained with Sennett for several years until she was signed by MGM.

She partnered with the famous Broadway star Marie Dressler in The Callahans and the Murphys (1927); and the two appeared in eight additional films together, such as Chasing Rainbows (1930), Caught Short (1930), and Prosperity (1932). After Dressler's death in 1934, Moran's career declined, and she only starred in low-budget comedies or B-movies. In 1940, Moran retired to her home in Laguna Beach, California, but maintained an active Hollywood social life and was known for practical jokes. She once ran a failed campaign for a Laguna Beach City Council seat on a "Pro Dogs" platform.

She made a brief comeback appearance in the Tracy-Hepburn classic comedy Adam's Rib in 1949. After playing the role, she said "I worked in the picture two days before I got a look at myself. I never went back."

Honors
Moran has a star on the Hollywood Walk of Fame at 6300 Hollywood Boulevard.

Personal life and death
After a marriage that ended in divorce in 1917, Moran married attorney and former prizefighter Martin T. Malone in 1933. Malone was abusive; he beat her and threatened to kill her, but she would not leave him.  She had one child, a son, who was adopted between her two marriages. She lived at 530 Mountain Road in Laguna Beach, California. Moran died of cardiovascular disease in 1952. Although a number of biographies give Moran's date of death as being January 25, 1952, her grave marker reads January 24, 1952.

Partial filmography

Their Social Splash (1915, Short) - Polly - the Unruly Guest
The Pullman Bride (1917, Short) - Sheriff Nell - the Pullman Drunk's Wife
Skirts (1921)
Two Weeks with Pay (1921) - Chambermaid
The Affairs of Anatol (1921) - Orchestra Leader (uncredited)
Luck (1923) - Dumb Dora - Fight Enthusiast
The Blackbird (1926) - Flower Lady at Music Hall (uncredited)
The Scarlet Letter (1926) - Jeering Townswoman (uncredited)
Twinkletoes (1926) - Minor Role (uncredited)
Flesh and the Devil (1926) - Family Retainer with Bouquet (uncredited)
The Show (1927) - Sideshow Spectator (uncredited)
The Callahans and the Murphys (1927) - Mrs. Murphy
The Thirteenth Hour (1927) - Polly
London After Midnight (1927) - Miss Smithson, the New Maid
The Enemy (1927) - Baruska
Buttons (1927) - Polly
The Divine Woman (1928) - Mme. Pigonier
Rose-Marie (1928) - Lady Jane
Bringing Up Father (1928) - Maggie Jiggs
The Trail of '98 (1928) - Lars' Nagging Wife (uncredited)
Detectives (1928) - Hotel Guest (uncredited)
Telling the World (1928) - Landlady
Beyond the Sierras (1928) - Inez
While the City Sleeps (1928) - Mrs. Minnie McGinnis
Show People (1928) - The Maid
Shadows of the Night (1928) - Entertainer
A Lady of Chance (1928) - Hotel Maid Who Coughs (uncredited)
Honeymoon (1928) - Polly
The Five O'Clock Girl (1928)
China Bound (1929) - Sarah
The Hollywood Revue of 1929 (1929) - Polly Moran
Speedway (1929) - Waitress
The Unholy Night (1929) - Polly - the Maid
So This Is College (1929) - Polly
Hot for Paris (1929) - Polly
Crazy House (1930, a short comedy with Benny Rubin)
Chasing Rainbows (1930) - Polly
The Girl Said No (1930) - Polly
Caught Short (1930) - Polly Smith
Way Out West (1930) - Pansy
Those Three French Girls (1930) - Elmer's Wife (uncredited)
Way for a Sailor (1930) - Polly
Remote Control (1930) - Polly
Paid (1930) - Polly (uncredited)
Reducing (1931) - Polly Rochay
The Stolen Jools (1931, Short) - Norma Shearer's Maid
It's a Wise Child (1931) - Bertha
Politics (1931) - Ivy Higgins
Guilty Hands (1931) - Aunt Maggie
The Passionate Plumber (1932) - Albine
Prosperity (1932) - Lizzie Praskins
Le plombier amoureux (1932) - Patricia Alden
Alice in Wonderland (1933) - Dodo Bird
Hollywood Party (1934) - Henrietta Clemp
Down to Their Last Yacht (1934) - Nella Fitzgerald
Two Wise Maids (1937) - Prudence Matthews
Ladies in Distress (1938) - Lydia Bonney
Red River Range (1938) - Mrs. Maxwell
Ambush (1939)  - Cora, diner owner
Tom Brown's School Days (1940) - Sally Harowell
Meet the Missus (1940) - Widow Ella Jones
Petticoat Politics (1941) - Widow Jones
Adam's Rib (1949) - Mrs. McGrath
The Yellow Cab Man (1950) - Bride's Mother (final film role)

References

External links

 
 
 
 Polly Moran profile

1883 births
1952 deaths
American women comedians
19th-century American actresses
American stage actresses
American film actresses
American silent film actresses
Actresses from Chicago
Vaudeville performers
Metro-Goldwyn-Mayer contract players
Burials at Forest Lawn Memorial Park (Glendale)
20th-century American actresses
Comedians from Illinois
20th-century American comedians